The Herbert Macaulay Affair is a 2019 Nigerian film based on the life of Herbert Macaulay, a Nigerian nationalist and proponent of Nigerian independence. It was directed by Imoh Umoren and featured William Benson in the lead role alongside Saidi Balogun, Kelechi Udegbe and Martha Ehinome Orhiere. The film also features Herbert Macaulay's grandson, Wale Macaulay. Other historical figures portrayed in the film include Alimotu Pelewura, leader of the Lagos Market Women's Association, Oba Eshugbayi Eleko, the Eleko of Eko at the time, Amodu Tijani Oluwa, the Chief Oluwa of Lagos and Henry Rawlingson Carr, educator and administrator.

Plot
The Herbert Macaulay Affair is set in 1920s Lagos during the Bubonic plague. It portrays Herbert Macaulay trying to call Nigerians to action in order to confront their oppressors. He led protests and wrote anti-colonial articles in newspapers. The film starts by depicting Macaulay's 1893 return from studying in Plymouth. He takes up a surveying job in service of the colonial administration. The workings of the colonial administration frustrate Macaulay, leading him to a life of rebellion.

Cast 
 William Benson as Herbert Macaulay
Saidi Balogun as Eleko
Kelechi Udegbe
 Martha Ehinome Orhiere
 Tubosun Ayedun
 Sunday Afolabi
 Mary Kowo as Alimotu Pelewura
 Phillip Jarman
 Stanley Matthews
 Obiora Maduegbuna
 Lolo Eremie
 Wale Macaulay

Crew 
 Director - Imoh Umoren
 Writer - Bisi Jamgbadi
 Editor - Olutayo Odugbesan
 Cinematography - Yemi Adeojo
 Gaffer - Sunday Olalekan
 Make-Up - Nneka Emekalam
 Costume - Seun Banjo
 Technical Cordinator - Dewumi Adedamola

Themes 
The Herbert Macaulay Affair explores the themes of love, loss and tragedy depicted in Macaulay's activism.

Production and release
The film explores about 3 decades of Herbert Macaulay's life where he continually rebels against the colonial government. Imo Umoren was inspired to make The Herbert Macaulay Affair while working on a documentary chronicling the 100 year history of Nigerian national figures.

Some scenes in the film were shot in Jaekel House and Mapo Hall.

Reception
A writer for Pulse Nigeria noted that films like The Herbert Macaulay Affair can help bridge a gap in teaching history to Nigerians as there was a preexisting misconception that Herbert Macaulay was a white man. A reviewer for YNaija however commented that the film was one of the most memorable flops of the year 2019 due to "tepid technical details matched with a half-baked screenplay and wooden actors."

References

External links

English-language Nigerian films
Nigerian films based on actual events
Biographical films about politicians
Films set in 1893
Films set in the 1920s
Films set in Lagos
2010s English-language films
2019 biographical drama films
Nigerian drama films
Nigerian biographical films